Architectural determinism (also sometimes referred to as environmental determinism though that term has a broader meaning) is a theory employed in urbanism, sociology and environmental psychology which claims the built environment is the chief or even sole determinant of social behaviour. A. S. Baum defines the notion thus "In its most extreme form, this position argues that the environment causes certain behaviours, denying any interaction between environment and behaviour. Architectural determinism poses the idea that people can adapt to any arrangement of space and that behaviour in a given environment is caused entirely by the characteristics of the environment."

The origins of the concept may be traced in Jeremy Bentham's Panopticon and in the Enlightenment bienfaisance as expressed in the institutional reform of prisons and hospitals. However the notion only gained generally currency and universal applicability with the rise of Behaviourism, Functionalism and the utopian social programme of the Modernist architectural movement. The term was first coined by Maurice Broady in his 1966 paper Social theory in Architectural Design  which also roundly criticised the authoritarian nature of this belief. Few architects have espoused the view that design can control behaviour but it has long been an assumption amongsts urbanists and architects that architecture can limit and channel behaviour in a predictable manner. This weaker, positivist view was articulated by Adolf Behne when he asserted "you can kill a man with a building just as easily as with an axe." The determinist belief was a contributory factor in the numerous slum clearances of the post War industrialised world (see Herbert J. Gans). Despite being a widely held, if not always articulated, theory the premise was not sustained by social research, for example the "Hawthorne experiments" by Mayo at Harvard found no direct correlation between work environment and output. The determinist hypothesis as an explanation of social conduct is now most often referred to in the literature as discredited, yet is still to be found as an argument for urban renewal.

Notes

Bibliography
Paul-Alan Johnson, The Theory of Architecture: Concepts, Themes, and Practices, 1994.

Architectural theory
Determinism